The Algemeen Nijmeegs Studentenblad is an independent student magazine for the Radboud University Nijmegen. Founded in 1985 by members of the local student union AKKU, it is now published by the Stichting Multimedia.

External links
 http://www.ans-online.nl/ (Flash required)

1985 establishments in the Netherlands
Dutch-language magazines
Independent magazines
Magazines established in 1985
Magazines published in the Netherlands
Radboud University Nijmegen
Student magazines
Student societies in the Netherlands